Zhaofeng Road is a station on the branch line of Line 11 of the Shanghai Metro. It is located in Huaqiao, Kunshan, Jiangsu. It is also one of three stations in the Shanghai Metro system that is not located in the municipality of Shanghai itself.

History
The station opened on 16 October 2013.

From 26 January 2020 to 24 March 2020, services on a segment of Line 11 between Huaqiao and Anting stations were suspended due to the COVID-19 pandemic.

References 

Railway stations in Jiangsu
Line 11, Shanghai Metro
Shanghai Metro stations in Kunshan
Railway stations in China opened in 2013